This is a list of the heads of state of South Africa from the foundation of the Union of South Africa in 1910 to the present day.

From 1910 to 1961 the head of state under the South Africa Act 1909 was the Monarch, who was the same person as the Monarch of the United Kingdom and of the other Dominions/Commonwealth realms. The Monarch was represented in South Africa by a Governor-General. South Africa became a republic under the Constitution of 1961 and the Monarch and Governor-General were replaced by a ceremonial State President. In 1984, under the Tricameral Constitution, the State President gained executive powers, becoming head of both state and government. Since 1994, under the Interim Constitution and the current Constitution, the head of state and government has been called the President.

Monarchs (1910–1961)
The succession to the throne of South Africa was the same as the succession to the British throne. During the Abdication Crisis the South African parliament passed its own act, "His Majesty King Edward the Eighth's Abdication Act, 1937", to ratify the abdication of Edward VIII.

Governor-General
The Governor-General was the representative of the monarch in South Africa and exercised most of the powers of the monarch. The Governor-General was appointed for an indefinite term, serving at the pleasure of the monarch. After the passage of the Statute of Westminster 1931 and the Status of the Union Act, 1934, the Governor-General was appointed solely on the advice of the Cabinet of South Africa without the involvement of the British government. In the event of a vacancy the Chief Justice served as Officer Administering the Government.

Status

Ceremonial State President of South Africa (1961–1984)
Under the 1961 Constitution, the first constitution of the Republic of South Africa, the State President replaced the Monarch as ceremonial head of state. The State President was elected by Parliament for a seven-year term. In the event of a vacancy the President of the Senate served as Acting State President.

Status

Executive State President of South Africa (1984–1994)
Under the 1983 Constitution the State President was head of both state and government. The State President was elected by an electoral college chosen by Parliament and served until the next general election, but was eligible for re-election. In the event of a vacancy the Cabinet would nominate a member to serve as Acting State President.

Status

President of South Africa (1994–present)
Under the Interim Constitution and the current Constitution the president of South Africa is head of both state and government. The president is elected by the National Assembly and serves a term that expires at the next general election; a president may serve a maximum of two terms. In the event of a vacancy the deputy president serves as acting president.

Timeline since 1961

Standards

References

 World Statesmen – South Africa
 Rulers.org – South Africa

Government of South Africa
H

South Africa